Pertusaria mccroryae is a species of white or greenish white crustose lichen. It is found in northwestern North America (Alaska, British Columbia, Idaho, Oregon, and Montana), in forests with old trees. It grows from low elevation to 1700m on bark of living trees (Picea sitchensis, Thuja plicata, and Tsuga heterophylla) or on logs, and is named in honor of Colleen McCrory, a Canadian Environmental Activist. The spore size and the chemistry distinguish it from other members of the genus.

References

mccroryae